Kurkovo is a rural locality (a village) in Chertkovskoye Rural Settlement, Selivanovsky District, Vladimir Oblast, Russia. The population was 16 as of 2010.

Geography 
Kurkovo is located 26 km east of Krasnaya Gorbatka (the district's administrative centre) by road. Chertkovo is the nearest rural locality.

References 

Rural localities in Selivanovsky District